A Night Out with the Backstreet Boys is the first unplugged acoustic concert show by the Backstreet Boys. It was recorded live at Viva Television in Cologne, Germany on March 28, 1998. It was first released in VHS format with a bonus CD titled Selections from A Night Out with the Backstreet Boys, and was released later on DVD on November 7, 2000. Two songs performed and included in this album, "Where Can We Go From Here?" and "Who Do You Love", were never released anywhere else as studio recordings.

Track listing
VHS/DVD
"Who Do You Love"
"As Long as You Love Me"
"10,000 Promises"
"That's What She Said" / "Where Can We Go from Here?" (Brian Littrell)
"Lay Down Beside Me" (A.J. McLean)
"I Need You Tonight" (Heaven In Your Eyes) (Nick Carter)
"My Heart Stays with You" (Howie Dorough)
Kevin's Solo (Untitled) (Kevin Richardson)
"Like a Child"
"All I Have to Give"
"If I Don't Have You" / "I'll Never Break Your Heart"
"Quit Playing Games (with My Heart)"
"Let's Have a Party"
"All I Have to Give" (Music Video) TV Version
"I'll Never Break Your Heart" (Music Video) U.S. Version

Bonus CD
"10.000 Promises" - 4:10
"That's What She Said" / "Where Can We Go from Here?" - 5:28
"Like a Child" - 6:18
"All I Have to Give" - 4:56
"If I Don’t Have You" / "I'll Never Break Your Heart" - 5:14
"Let's Have a Party" - 4:00
Millennium sneak preview: "The One" / "Show Me the Meaning of Being Lonely" / "I Need You Tonight" - 4:20

Certifications

References

Backstreet Boys albums
1998 EPs
1998 video albums
1998 live albums
Live video albums
Live EPs